Penjamillo de Degollado is a place in the Mexican state of Michoacán.

Populated places in Michoacán